Code red was a computer worm observed on the Internet on July 15, 2001. It attacked computers running Microsoft's IIS web server. It was the first large scale, mixed threat attack to successfully target enterprise networks.

The Code Red worm was first discovered and researched by eEye Digital Security employees Marc Maiffret and Ryan Permeh when it exploited a vulnerability discovered by Riley Hassell. They named it "Code Red" because Mountain Dew Code Red was what they were drinking at the time.

Although the worm had been released on July 13, the largest group of infected computers was seen on July 19, 2001. On that day, the number of infected hosts reached 359,000.

It spread worldwide but was particularly prevalent in North America, Europe and Asia (including China and India).

Concept

Exploited vulnerability

The worm showed a vulnerability in the growing software distributed with IIS, described in Microsoft Security Bulletin MS01-033, for which a patch had been available a month earlier.

The worm spread itself using a common type of vulnerability known as a buffer overflow. It did this by using a long string of the repeated letter 'N' to overflow a buffer, allowing the worm to execute arbitrary code and infect the machine with the worm. Kenneth D. Eichman was the first to discover how to block it, and was invited to the White House for his discovery.

Worm payload 
The payload of the worm included:

 Defacing the affected web site to display:

 HELLO! Welcome to http://www.worm.com! Hacked By Chinese!

 Other activities based on day of the month:
 Days 1-19: Trying to spread itself by looking for more IIS servers on the Internet.
 Days 20–27: Launch denial of service attacks on several fixed IP addresses.  The IP address of the White House web server was among those.
 Days 28-end of month: Sleeps, no active attacks.

When scanning for vulnerable machines, the worm did not test to see if the server running on a remote machine was running a vulnerable version of IIS, or even to see if it was running IIS at all. Apache access logs from this time frequently had entries such as these:

The worm's payload is the string following the last 'N'. Due to a buffer overflow, a vulnerable host interpreted this string as computer instructions, propagating the worm.

Similar worms

On the 4th of August 2001, Code Red II appeared. Although it used the same injection vector, it had a completely different payload. It pseudo-randomly chose targets on the same or different subnets as the infected machines according to a fixed probability distribution, favoring targets on its own subnet more often than not. Additionally, it used the pattern of repeating 'X' characters instead of 'N' characters to overflow the buffer.

eEye believed that the worm originated in Makati, Philippines, the same origin as the VBS/Loveletter (aka "ILOVEYOU") worm.

See also

Nimda Worm
Timeline of computer viruses and worms

References

External links
Code Red II analysis, Steve Friedl's Unixwiz.net, last update 22 August 2001
CAIDA Analysis of Code-Red, Cooperative Association for Internet Data Analysis (CAIDA) at the San Diego Supercomputer Center (SDSC), updated November 2008 
Animation showing the spread of the Code Red worm on 19 July 2001, by Jeff Brown, UCSD, and David Moore, CAIDA at SDSC

Hacking in the 2000s
2001 in computing
July 2001 events
Windows malware
Exploit-based worms
Cybercrime in India